Italy at the European Throwing Cup participated at all editions of the European Throwing Cup from Nice 2001.

The event was called European Winter Throwing Challenge until 2004, than European Cup Winter Throwing until 2016.

Medals

Individual

Team

See also
 Italy national athletics team

Notes

References

External links
 European Athletic Association

 
Athletics in Italy
Italy national athletics team